Parliamentary elections were held in Norway on 24 October 1921. This was the first election to use proportional representation, which replaced previous two-round system. The result was a victory for the Conservative Party-Free-minded Liberal Party alliance, which won 57 of the 150 seats in the Storting.

Results

Seat distribution

References

General elections in Norway
1920s elections in Norway
Norway
Parliamentary
Norway